Heikki Haara (born 20 November 1982) is a Finnish former football player. He formerly played for Wimbledon F.C.,

References
Guardian Football

1982 births
Living people
Finnish footballers
Finnish expatriate footballers
FC Lahti players
FC Jokerit players
Veikkausliiga players
Association football defenders
Sportspeople from Lahti